Manola del Carmen Robles Delgado (1 November 1948 – 3 January 2021) was a Chilean journalist. She wrote primarily on economics and politics and worked for Radio Cooperativa in the 1980s and 1990s.

References

1948 births
2021 deaths